Contortipalpia santiagalis is a moth in the family Crambidae. It was described by Schaus in 1920. It is found in Cuba.

References

Glaphyriinae
Moths described in 1920
Endemic fauna of Cuba